Maria Bueno defeated the defending champion Margaret Smith in the final, 6–4, 7–9, 6–3 to win the ladies' singles tennis title at the 1964 Wimbledon Championships.

Seeds

  Margaret Smith (final)
  Maria Bueno (champion)
  Billie Jean Moffitt (semifinals)
  Lesley Turner (semifinals)
  Nancy Richey (quarterfinals)
  Ann Jones (quarterfinals)
  Jan Lehane (third round)
  Robyn Ebbern (quarterfinals)

Draw

Finals

Top half

Section 1

Section 2

Section 3

Section 4

Bottom half

Section 5

Section 6

Section 7

Section 8

References

External links

Women's Singles
Wimbledon Championship by year – Women's singles
Wimbledon Championships
Wimbledon Championships